The 2012 Charlottesville Men's Pro Challenger was a professional tennis tournament played on hard courts. It was the fourth edition of the tournament which was part of the 2012 ATP Challenger Tour. It took place in Charlottesville, United States between October 29 and November 4, 2012.

Singles main-draw entrants

Seeds

 1 Rankings are as of October 22, 2012.

Other entrants
The following players received wildcards into the singles main draw:
  Somdev Devvarman
  Alexander Domijan
  Austin Krajicek
  Michael McClune

The following players received entry from the qualifying draw:
  Taro Daniel
  Eric Quigley
  Mac Styslinger
  Fritz Wolmarans

Champions

Singles

 Denis Kudla def.  Alex Kuznetsov, 6–0, 6–3

Doubles

 John Peers /  John-Patrick Smith def.  Jarmere Jenkins /  Jack Sock, 7–5, 6–1

External links
Official Website

Charlottesville Men's Pro Challenger
Charlottesville Men's Pro Challenger